Radix luteola is a species of freshwater snail, an aquatic gastropod mollusc in the family Lymnaeidae.

Placement of this species within the genus Radix was confirmed by Correa et al. (2010).

There exist two forms of this species:
 Radix luteola f. australis
 Radix luteola f. ovalis

Distribution 
Radix luteola is a widespread species in south Asia and southeast Asia.

Parasites 
Radix luteola is the first intermediate host for the trematodes:
 Schistosoma nasale
 Schistosoma indicum
 Schistosoma spindale
 Schistosoma suis
 Schistosoma incognitum
 Fasciola gigantica
 Fasciola hepatica
 Clinostomum giganticum
 Echinostoma revolutum
 Orientobilharzia dattae
 Echinoparyphium bugulai

References

External links 
 Devkota, R.; Brant, S. V.; Loker, E. S. (2016). "A genetically distinct Schistosoma from Radix luteola from Nepal related to Schistosoma turkestanicum: a phylogenetic study of schistosome and snail host". Acta Tropica. 164: 45–53. https://dx.doi.org/10.1016/j.actatropica.2016.08.015

Lymnaeidae
Gastropods described in 1822